Brendan Schoonbaert (born 9 May 2000) is a Belgian professional footballer who currently plays for Royal Knokke F.C..

External links

2000 births
Living people
Belgian footballers
Belgium youth international footballers
Club Brugge KV players
S.K. Beveren players
Lommel S.K. players
K.M.S.K. Deinze players
Belgian Pro League players
Challenger Pro League players
Association football defenders